Moon-soo is a Korean masculine given name. Its meaning differs based on the hanja used to write each syllable of the name. There are 14 hanja with the reading "moon" and 57 hanja with the reading "soo" on the South Korean government's official list of hanja which may be registered for use in given names.

People with this name include:
Park Mun-su (1691–1756), Joseon Dynasty secret royal inspector under King Yeongjo
Kim Moon-soo (politician) (born 1951), South Korean politician, 32nd governor of Gyeonggi Province
Kim Moon-soo (badminton) (born 1963), South Korean badminton player

Fictional characters with this name include:
Munsu, in South Korean-Japanese comic Blade of the Phantom Master
Mun-su, in 2003 South Korean film Please Teach Me English
Mun-su, in 2008 South Korean film Public Enemy Returns
Jung Moon-soo, in 2011 South Korean television series Sign
Moon-soo, in 2012 South Korean film In Another Country
Park Moon-soo, in 2012 South Korean television series History of a Salaryman
Park Moon-soo, in 2013 South Korean television series Pretty Man
Jang Moon-soo, in 2014 South Korean television series God's Gift - 14 Days

See also
List of Korean given names

References

Korean masculine given names